The cabinet of Matija Nenadović was formed on 27 August 1805. It was the first government of Serbia. It held office until April 1807, when it was replaced by the cabinet of Mladen Milovanović.

Timeline 

Following the slaughter of the Knezes in 1804, a group of leading Serbs decided to begin an uprising against dahijas; they soon after elected Đorđe Petrović, a merchant better known as Karađorđe, as their leader. His forces assumed control of Požarevac, Šabac, Smederevo, and Belgrade, after which they held Austrian-mediated negotiations with the Ottomans in order to secure autonomy for the Serbs. The negotiations broke down in 1805, after which the Battle of Ivankovac occurred, in which the Serb forces were defeated. Dukes Jakov Nenadović, Matija Nenadović, Milan Obrenović, and Sima Marković, with the assistance of Adam Jerzy Czartoryski, the minister of foreign affairs of the Russian Empire, proposed the creation of a government in order to limit Karađorđe's powers. Karađorđe accepted the formation of the government on conditions that the government would help him with military and foreign policy.

This led to the formation of the first government of Serbia, known as the Serbian Governing Council. With the Assembly of Uprising Champions, it represented the authority in Revolutionary Serbia. The government organized and supervised the administration, economy, judiciary, foreign policy, order, and the supply of arms for Serb forces. The founding assembly of the Governing Council was held on 14 August 1805 in Marković's house near Barajevo. Together with his cabinet, Matija Nenadović was appointed president of the Governing Council on 27 August 1805.

The government's headquarters were initially at Voljavča and then at Bogovađa, although it was later moved to Smedereveo.

Composition 
The cabinet was composed of 12 representatives from 12 nahiyahs from among whom the president was elected every month. The cabinet was re-shuffled in December 1805, after which the cabinet was composed of Jakov Nenadović, Janko Katić, Milenko Stojković, Luka Lazarević, and Milan Obrenović, with Nenadović as president.

Aftermath 
Nenadović stepped down as president of the Governing Council in April 1807. He was succeeded by Mladen Milovanović, who headed the government until 1810.

References 

Cabinets of Serbia
1805 establishments in Europe
1807 disestablishments in Europe
Political history of Serbia
Cabinets disestablished in 1807